Diédougou is a rural commune in the Cercle of Kati in the Koulikoro Region of western Mali. The commune includes 16 villages. The main village (chef-lieu) is Torodo. In the 2009 census the commune had a population of 9,381.

References

External links
.

Communes of Koulikoro Region